Hogan's Heroes is an American television sitcom set in a Nazi German prisoner-of-war (POW) camp during World War II. It ran for 168 episodes (six seasons) from September 17, 1965, to April 4, 1971, on the CBS network, the longest broadcast run for an American television series inspired by that war.

Bob Crane starred as Colonel Robert E. Hogan, coordinating an international crew of Allied prisoners covertly running a special operations group from the camp. Werner Klemperer played Colonel Wilhelm Klink, the gullible commandant of the camp, and John Banner played the blundering but lovable sergeant-of-the-guard, Hans Schultz.

Overview

Hogan's Heroes centers on U.S. Army Air Forces Colonel Robert Hogan and his staff of experts who are prisoners of war (POW) during World War II. The plot occurs during the permanent winter season in the fictionalized Stalag 13 just outside Hammelburg in Nazi Germany, though details in the show are inconsistent with the real-life camp and city's location in Franconia. The group secretly uses the camp to conduct Allied espionage and sabotage and to help escaped Allied POWs from other prison camps via a secret network of tunnels that operate under the ineptitude of commandant Colonel Klink and his sergeant-at-arms, Sergeant Schultz. The prisoners cooperate with resistance groups (collectively called "the Underground"), defectors, spies, counterspies, and disloyal officers to accomplish this. They devise schemes such as having Sergeant Carter visit the camp disguised as Adolf Hitler as a distraction, or rescuing a French Underground agent from Gestapo headquarters in Paris.

To the bafflement of his German colleagues who know him as an incompetent sycophant, Klink technically has a perfect operational record as camp commandant as no prisoners have successfully escaped during his tenure; Hogan and his men assist in maintaining this record so they can continue with their covert operations. Considering Klink's record, and the fact that the Allies would never bomb a POW camp, Stalag 13 appears to be a very secure location. As a result, the Germans often use the camp for high-level meetings, to hide important persons and develop secret projects. Klink frequently has many other important visitors and is temporarily put in charge of special prisoners. This brings the prisoners in contact with many important VIPs, scientists, spies, high-ranking officers, and some of Germany's most sophisticated and secret weapons projects such as the Wunderwaffe and the German nuclear weapons program, of which the prisoners take advantage in their efforts to hinder the German war effort.

Setting
The setting is the fictional Luft Stalag 13, a prisoner-of-war camp for captured Allied airmen. Like the historical Stalag XIII-C, it is located just outside of a town called Hammelburg, though its actual location is fictional. The show is a combination of several writing styles that were popular in the 1960s: the "wartime" show, the "spy" show, and "camp comedy".

Although in reality Hammelburg is well inland in Franconia, several first-season episodes place the camp closer to the North Sea (perhaps to make successful escapes to England more plausible). To complicate matters even further, it is mentioned in several episodes (e.g. In the second-season episode "Diamonds in the Rough", at 15:31, a road sign near the camp reads "Somburg" , "Hamilburg" [sic] , and "Dusseldorf" [sic]  in one direction and "Hafberg"  in the other direction.

The camp has 103 Allied prisoners of war (POWs) during the first season, but becomes larger by the end of the series.

In Stalag 13 it is always a snowy winter. Beyond recreating an extreme or adverse setting, this was to prevent problems with continuity and to allow the episodes to be shown in any order.

Cast

Bob Crane as Colonel Robert Hogan, the senior ranking POW officer and the leader of the men in the POW camp. He uses his wit and ingenuity in missions to counter the Nazis' battle plans. Crane was offered the role after appearing as "guy next door" types in television shows like The Dick Van Dyke Show and as a regular in The Donna Reed Show.

Werner Klemperer as Colonel Wilhelm Klink, the commandant of the POW camp. He is painfully unaware of Hogan's operation and believes the camp has a perfect escape record under his command. In real life, Klemperer was from a Jewish family (his father was the orchestral conductor Otto Klemperer) and found the role to be a "double-edged sword"; his agent initially failed to tell him the role of Klink was intended to be comedic. Klemperer remarked, "I had one qualification when I took the job: if they ever wrote a segment whereby Colonel Klink would come out the hero, I would leave the show."

John Banner as Sergeant Hans Schultz, the camp's first sergeant. He is a clumsy and inept, but extremely affable man who often gives out information to the prisoners for bribes, often LeBeau's gourmet cooking.  Hogan and his men often performed their subversive activities in plain sight of Schultz, knowing he would never report it for fear of being punished and sent to fight at the Russian front. He would often exit  the scene saying his iconic phrase "I see nothing, I hear nothing, I know nothing. Nothing!".  Banner was born to Jewish parents and was in fact a sergeant during World War II, but in the U.S. Army.

Robert Clary as Corporal Louis LeBeau, a gourmet chef, and patriotic Frenchman, frequently referred to as "the cockroach" by both Klink and Schultz. He has trained the guard dogs to be friendly towards the prisoners and uses the dogs' kennels as entrances for the prisoners' allies arriving at the camp. Clary was Jewish in real life and was deported to a Nazi concentration camp, but survived by using his talent in singing and dancing in shows. Clary said in an interview with the Los Angeles Times, "Singing, entertaining, and being in kind of good health at my age, that's why I survived. I was very immature and young and not really fully realizing what situation I was involved with ... I don't know if I would have survived if I really knew that."

Richard Dawson as Corporal Peter Newkirk, the group's conman, magician, pick-pocket, card sharp, forger, bookie, tailor, lock picker, and safe cracker. He is a skilled tailor and is in charge of making uniforms for POWs impersonating high-ranking German officials. Dawson's role as a military member in the film King Rat was reportedly the reason for his spot in Hogan's Heroes.

Ivan Dixon as Staff Sergeant James Kinchloe (season 1-5), the man responsible for contacting the underground by electronic communications. Kinchloe usually uses Morse code, telephones, and a coffee pot radio to receive and transmit messages. Casting Dixon, or any African-American actor, as a positively shown supporting character was a major step for a television show in the mid-1960s. Dixon left the show prior to the final season and was replaced by Kenneth Washington as Sgt. Richard Baker, another African-American character but with a less prominent role.

Larry Hovis as Technical Sergeant Andrew Carter, a bombardier who is an expert in chemistry, explosives, and demolitions. He is in charge of making and producing chemicals and explosive devices in order to thwart the Nazis' plans. Hovis was discovered by Richard Linke, the producer of The Andy Griffith Show, and played a recurring character on Gomer Pyle, U.S.M.C. before landing the role of Sergeant Carter.

Kenneth Washington as Sergeant Richard Baker (season 6). He assumed the duties of Sergeant Kinchloe after Ivan Dixon left the series. With the death of Robert Clary on November 16, 2022,  Kenneth Washington became the only surviving main cast member of the show left.

Broadcast history
Friday at 8:30–9:00 p.m. on CBS: September 17, 1965 – April 7, 1967; September 26, 1969 – March 27, 1970
Saturday at 9:00–9:30 p.m. on CBS: September 9, 1967 – March 22, 1969
Sunday at 7:30–8:00 p.m. on CBS: September 20, 1970 – April 4, 1971

Production

Locations
Hogan's Heroes was filmed in two locations. Indoor sets were housed at Desilu Studios, later renamed as Paramount Studios for Season Four and then Cinema General Studios for Seasons Five and Six. Outdoor scenes were filmed on the 40 Acres Backlot. 40 Acres was in Culver City, in the Los Angeles metropolitan area. The studios for indoor scenes were both located in Hollywood. Producers had to create the effect that there was always a snowy winter, unusual in warm Southern California but normal in the German winter. The actors had to wear warm clothes and frequently act like they were cold.

Although it was never snowing on the film set and the weather was apparently sunny, there was snow on the ground and building roofs, and frost on the windows. The set designers created the illusion of snow two ways: the snow during the first several seasons was made out of salt. By the fourth season, the show’s producers found a more permanent solution and lower cost, using white paint to give the illusion of snow. By the sixth and final season, with a smaller budget, most of the snow shown on the set was made out of paint.

After the series ended in 1971, the set remained standing until it was destroyed in 1974 while the final scene of Ilsa, She Wolf of the SS was filmed.

Theme music 
The theme music was composed by Jerry Fielding, who added lyrics to the theme for Hogan's Heroes Sing The Best of World War II – an album featuring Dixon, Clary, Dawson, and Hovis singing World War II songs. The song also appeared on the album Bob Crane, His Drums and Orchestra, Play the Funny Side of TV.

Casting 

The actors who played the four major German roles—Werner Klemperer (Klink), John Banner (Schultz), Leon Askin (General Burkhalter), and Howard Caine (Major Hochstetter)—were all Jewish. In fact, Klemperer, Banner, and Askin had all fled the Nazis during World War II (Caine, whose birth name was Cohen, was an American). Robert Clary, a French Jew who played LeBeau, spent three years in a concentration camp (with an identity tattoo from the camp on his arm, "A-5714"); his parents and other family members were killed there. Likewise, Banner had been held in a (pre-war) concentration camp and his family was killed during the war. Askin was also in a pre-war French internment camp and his parents were killed at Treblinka. Other Jewish actors, including Harold Gould and Harold J. Stone, made multiple appearances playing German generals.

As a teenager, Klemperer, the son of conductor Otto Klemperer, fled Hitler's Germany with his family in 1933. During the show's production, he insisted that Hogan always win against his Nazi captors, or else he would not take the part of Klink. He defended his role by claiming, "I am an actor. If I can play Richard III, I can play a Nazi." Banner attempted to sum up the paradox of his role by saying, "Who can play Nazis better than us Jews?" Klemperer, Banner, Caine, Gould, and Askin had all spent the real Second World War serving in the U.S. Armed Forces—Banner and Askin in the U.S. Army Air Corps, Caine in the U.S. Navy, Gould with the U.S. Army, and Klemperer in a U.S. Army Entertainment Unit. Klemperer had previously played a Nazi: in 1961 he played captured Nazi Emil Hahn in Judgment at Nuremberg, and also in 1961 starred as the title character in the serious drama Operation Eichmann, which also featured Banner in a supporting role. Ruta Lee, Theodore Marcuse, and Oscar Beregi, Jr. each of whom went on to make several guest appearances on Hogan’s Heroes, also appeared in the film.

German release: Ein Käfig voller Helden 
Despite its international success as a parody of the Nazis, the series was unknown on German television for decades due to the language barrier (none of their characters spoke German except for some single words), and the obvious fact that portraying Nazis on German TV (even comedically) continued to be a sore spot for many years.

German film distributor KirchGruppe acquired broadcasting rights to the show but initially did not air it out of fear that it would offend viewers; in 1992, Hogan's Heroes was finally aired on German television for the first time, but the program failed to connect with viewers due to issues with lip syncing. However, after the dialogue was rewritten to make the characters look even more foolish (ensuring that viewers understood the characters were caricatures) the show became more successful.

First aired with a title that translates roughly as 'Barbed Wire and Heels', it was soon renamed, somewhat more whimsically in German, to Ein Käfig voller Helden ("A Cage Full of Heroes"), to make it more relatable to the German viewer. Klink and Schultz's characters were given broad Saxon and Bavarian dialects, playing on regional stereotypes to underline the notion that they are comic figures. An unseen original character – "Frau Kalinke" – was introduced as Klink's cleaning lady and perennial mistress whom he described as performing most of her cleaning duties in the nude.

Legal issues
Donald Bevan and Edmund Trzcinski, the writers of the 1951 play Stalag 17, a World War II prisoner-of-war story turned into a 1953 feature film by Paramount Pictures, sued Bing Crosby Productions, the show’s producer, for infringement. Their lawsuit was unsuccessful. While the jury found in favor of the plaintiffs, a federal judge overruled them. The judge found "striking difference in the dramatic mood of the two works."

In 2012, an arbitration hearing was scheduled to determine whether Bernard Fein and Albert S. Ruddy, the creators of the show, had transferred the right to make a movie of Hogan's Heroes to Bing Crosby Productions along with the television rights or had retained the derivative movie rights. In 2013, Fein (through his estate) and Ruddy acquired the sequel and other separate rights to Hogan’s Heroes from Mark Cuban via arbitration, and a movie based on the show was planned.

Reception
Hogan's Heroes won two Emmy Awards out of twelve nominations. Both wins were for Werner Klemperer as Outstanding Performance by an Actor in a Supporting Role in a Comedy, in 1968 and 1969. Klemperer received nominations in the same category in 1966, 1967 and 1970. The series' other nominations were for Outstanding Comedy Series in 1966, 1967 and 1968; Bob Crane for Outstanding Continued Performance by an Actor in a Leading Role in a Comedy Series in 1966 and 1967; Nita Talbot for Outstanding Performance by an Actress in a Supporting Role in a Comedy in 1968; and Gordon Avil for cinematography in 1968.

The producers of Hogan's Heroes were honored in the first annual NAACP Image Awards, presented in August 1967, one of seven television show and two news shows that were recognized for "the furtherance of the Negro image." Other honorees included I Spy, Daktari, Star Trek and Mission Impossible. 

In December 2005, the series was listed at number 100 as part of the "Top 100 Most Unexpected Moments in TV History" by TV Guide and TV Land. The show was described as an "unlikely POW camp comedy."

Nielsen ratings
Note: The highest average rating for the series is in bold text.

Home media
CBS DVD (distributed by Paramount) has released all six seasons of Hogan's Heroes on DVD in regions 1 and 4. The series was previously released by Columbia House as individual discs, each with five or six consecutive episodes, as well as on a compilation 42 VHS collection of the 168 episodes.

On March 8, 2016, CBS Home Entertainment re-released a repackaged version of the complete series set, at a lower price.

In Australia (Region 4), the first DVD releases were from Time–Life (from around 2002–2005) with each disc sold individually with 4–5 episodes per disc. Between 2005 and 2007 these same discs were packaged as individual complete-season collections.

The complete series was released on Blu-ray in Germany in 2018. The set consists of 23 double-layer BD-50 discs. The discs are region-free.  While menus and titles are in German, the episodes include both German and original English audio tracks.
On December 13, 2022, Paramount Pictures released the entire blu-ray series in the U.S.

Merchandise and promotion
In 1965, Fleer produced a 66-trading card set based on the series. Dell Comics produced nine issues of a series based on the show from 1966 to 1969, all with photo covers. The artwork was provided by Henry Scarpelli. Mad magazine #108 (January 1967) parodied the show as "Hokum's Heroes". An additional one-page parody called "Hochman's Heroes" took the show's premise to the next level by setting it in Buchenwald concentration camp.

In 1968, Clary, Dawson, Dixon, and Hovis recorded an album titled Hogan's Heroes Sing the Best of World War II, which included lyrics for the theme song. While the show was in production, Crane, Klemperer, Askin, and Banner all appeared (as different characters) in the 1968 film The Wicked Dreams of Paula Schultz.

See also
 'Allo 'Allo!
 Auto Focus
 Colditz Castle
 The Colditz Story
 Colditz (1972 TV series)
 Escape to Victory
 The Great Escape
 Heil Honey I'm Home!
 Oflag XIII-B – officers' camp located outside Hammelburg

References

External links

Hogan's Heroes Episode Guide at TV Gems

 

1965 American television series debuts
1971 American television series endings
1960s American sitcoms
1970s American sitcoms
CBS original programming
Espionage television series
World War II television comedy series
Television series by CBS Studios
Television series set in the 1940s
Military comedy television series
American prison television series
Television series about Nazis
Television shows adapted into comics
English-language television shows
Television shows involved in plagiarism controversies
1970s prison television series
Prisoners of war in popular culture